Kelly Groucutt (born Michael William Groucutt; 8 September 1945 – 19 February 2009) was an English musician, best known as the bassist and occasional vocalist for the rock band Electric Light Orchestra (ELO) between 1974 and 1982.

Early career
Groucutt was born in Coseley, West Midlands. He began his musical career at 15 as Rikki Storm of Rikki Storm and the Falcons. He sang with multiple outfits during the 1960s, picking up the guitar as he went along. Groucutt was also a member of a band called "Sight and Sound", and later with a band called "Barefoot".

Electric Light Orchestra 

While playing with Barefoot in Birmingham, he was spotted by ELO's Jeff Lynne; and after Lynne, Bev Bevan and Richard Tandy had watched him play, he was invited to join ELO, to replace Mike de Albuquerque, who had recently left the band. Upon joining, he was asked to adopt a stage name because ELO had already had several members named Michael, Mike or Mik; he chose Kelly (a school nickname). ELO then set off on their Eldorado tour. The first Electric Light Orchestra album to feature Groucutt on bass guitar and as a backing vocalist was Face the Music (1975). He assumed lead vocal duties on one or two album tracks typically, and his vocals can be heard on later ELO songs, most prominently on songs such as "Nightrider" (1975), "Poker" (1975), "Above the Clouds" (1976), "Across the Border" (1977), "Night in the City" (1977), "Sweet is the Night" (1977) and "The Diary of Horace Wimp" (1979). Groucutt often displayed his operatic vocal talents during live performances of "Rockaria!" (1976), though these were not performed in the studio.

Groucutt continued contributing on the albums A New World Record (1976), Out of the Blue (1977), Discovery (1979), Xanadu (1980), Time (1981), and the early sessions for Secret Messages (1983). By Time, Groucutt's role in the band was reduced by Lynne from co-lead vocals to backing vocals exclusively.

In 1982, he released his self-titled, debut solo album, Kelly. This album featured fellow ELO members Bev Bevan, Richard Tandy, Mik Kaminski and their orchestral co-arranger and conductor Louis Clark. In 2001, the album was remastered for CD.

Groucutt remained with ELO until the onset of the recording sessions for the album Secret Messages in 1982. It was at this juncture that he left the band, unhappy with royalty payments during his tenure, and made the decision to sue management and band leader Jeff Lynne. A settlement for the sum of £300,000 was reached out of court prior to proceedings, but Groucutt later reflected that he regretted suing Lynne. He is credited with playing bass on Secret Messages, although the 2018 album liner notes state that he only played on four songs ("Train of Gold" and "Rock n Roll is King" from the single disc release and "No Way Out" and "Beatles Forever") from the original double album.

During the mid-to-late 1980s, Groucutt worked further on his solo career, including the We Love Animals EP in 1985 to benefit the RSPCA.

Groucutt played a Gibson G3 bass as well as a Fender Precision Bass, an Ovation acoustic guitar and Hofner 500/1 bass guitar during much of his tenure in Electric Light Orchestra.

OrKestra 

In the late 1980s, he and former band mate Mik Kaminski formed the group OrKestra. The pair quickly became dissatisfied with the poor promotion and record label the band received, especially as their first album, Beyond The Dream was delayed. Though at least one song was ready for use in the 1989 film Summer Job, the album itself was not released until 1991. By that point, Kaminski and Groucutt, joined by fellow ELO member Hugh McDowell, had guest starred in a tour with ELO Part II. In 1992, Groucutt and Kaminski both joined ELO Part II.

In 1993, the group's second album, Roll Over Beethoven was released under the OrKestra name, though by that point the band was seemingly defunct. It included more material from Groucutt and Kaminski's tenure in the band. It is unknown if OrKestra continued on after the two left.

ELO Part II and The Orchestra 

During his time in ELO Part II, Groucutt frequently shared lead vocal duties with Neil Lockwood, Phil Bates, Peter Haycock, and Eric Troyer. However, Haycock and Lockwood both left the band shortly after Groucutt's arrival. When the group released Moment of Truth, Groucutt contributed the song "The Fox", and co-wrote "Blue Violin" and "Twist of the Knife". Groucutt also appeared on the live albums Performing ELO's Greatest Hits Live and One Night - Live in Australia.

While Groucutt was primarily the group's bassist, during some songs he would play guitar instead.

When Bev Bevan sold his half of the rights to ELO back to Jeff Lynne in 1999, Groucutt chose to remain with the group. It was renamed The Orchestra, in an attempt to get past Lynne's refusal to allow this group to bank on the past reputation of Groucutt, Kaminski, and Clark. He again made writing contributions to the group's next album, No Rewind, by co-writing the closing track, "Before We Go".

Personal life
Kelly Groucutt was married twice. His first marriage produced three sons (Christopher, Steven, and Robin) and a daughter (Jenny). The birth of his fourth child was around the same time he began to depart from ELO. In 2006, Groucutt wed Anna-Maria Bialaga. They remained married until his death.

Death
On 18 February 2009, Groucutt returned from a sell-out show with The Orchestra in Berlin. He suffered a heart attack shortly after, and died on 19 February at the Worcestershire Royal Hospital in Worcester. His family held a small, exclusive concert with members from The Orchestra in his memory.

After a successful crowdfunding campaign was held by his family, a plaque commemorating Groucutt was placed at his childhood home, where his family lived from 1937 to 1992.

References

1945 births
2009 deaths
20th-century bass guitarists
20th-century English singers
Electric Light Orchestra members
English male singer-songwriters
English rock bass guitarists
English rock guitarists
Male bass guitarists
People from Coseley
20th-century British male singers